Bad Ink is an American reality television series that premiered on August 11, 2013, on A&E. The series follows tattoo artist and musician Dirk Vermin, owner of Pussykat Tattoo off the Las Vegas Strip, and his friend and bandmate Rob Ruckus as they seek out bad tattoos and, for some, transform them with skilled cover-up work. Season 2 premiered on January 20, 2014.

Characters

Episodes

Series overview

Season 1 (2013)

Season 2 (2014)

See also
List of tattoo TV shows
 The Vermin – Vermin and Ruckus' band

References

General references

External links
 
 Bad Ink on Internet Movie Database
 Bad Ink on TV.com

2010s American reality television series
2013 American television series debuts
2014 American television series endings
Television shows set in the Las Vegas Valley
A&E (TV network) original programming
Tattooing television series